Alsace Manor is a census-designated place (CDP) in Alsace Township, Berks County, Pennsylvania, United States. It is located approximately seven miles northeast of the city of Reading.  As of the 2010 census, the population was 478.

Demographics

References

Census-designated places in Berks County, Pennsylvania
Census-designated places in Pennsylvania